This is a list of caves in Belgium, all located in Wallonia.

 Trou de l’Abîme
 Goyet Caves
 Caves of Han-sur-Lesse
 Caves of Hotton
 Grotte de Spy
 Grotte La Merveilleuse
 Naulette
 Neptune Caves
 Caves of Remouchamps
 Grotte de Rosée
 Scladina
 Grotte de ROCHEFORT
 Souffleur de BEAUREGARD
 Système CHAWRESSE-VERONIKA
 Réseau de WAERIMONT
 Trou d'HAQUIN
 Réseau de FRENES
 Grotte du Noû Bleu
 Système WERON-DELLIEUX
 Chantoir de BERON-RY
 Système FAGNOULES-BUC
 Grotte SAINTE-ANNE
 Système Fosse aux Ours
 Système WUINANT-Haminte
 Trou du NOU-MAULIN
 Galerie des SOURCES
 Grotte du PERE NOEL
 Grotte des EMOTIONS
 Abri du Risous
 Système de BRETAYE
 Trou des Manants
 Grotte de l'ADUGEOIR
 Grottes de GOYET
 Trou des CREVES
 Abime du FOURNEAU
 Grotte du FAYT
 Grotte BEBRONNE - CLISORE
 Grande grotte de Malacord
 Grotte de RAMIOUL
 Chantoir de Rostène
 Grotte MICHAUX
 Grotte de la FONTAINE DE RIVIRE
 Trou de la Chaise
 Trou de l'EGLISE
 Grotte de la VILAINE SOURCE
 Grande Faille du Fond des Cris
 Trou BERNARD
 Système ENFER-FISSURES
 Grotte du Chalet
 Chantoir de Valentin
 Grotte du PRE-AU-TONNEAU
 TROU-QUI-FUME
 Grotte NYS
 Grotte d'EPRAVE
 Grotte de Pont d'Arcole
 Grotte de l'Isbelle
 Nouvelle Grotte de ON
 Abime de COMBLAIN-AU-PONT
 Chantoir de la LAIDE FOSSE
 Abime de Lesves/Hyacinthes
 TROU DES NUTONS
 Grotte-Mine & Grotte de l'Etang de la Villa des Hirondelles
 Chantoir de ROUGE THIERS
 Trou des Côtes
 Grottes de Floreffe
 Trou du PARRAIN
 Grotte des SURDENTS
 Chantoir d'ADSEUX
 Trou MANTO/ST-ETIENNE
 Chantoir du Moulin
 Chantoir de KIN
 Trou du Bonheur
 Grotte ALEXANDRE
 Chantoir de SECHEVAL
 Système BOHON-RENARD
 Grotte de HIERGES-VAUCELLES
 Grotte HEINRICHS
 Grotte STEINLEIN
 Grotte du CHAFOUR
 Grotte de la MYSTERIEUSE
 Trou OZER

See also 
 List of caves
 Speleology

Belgium
Caves